Plataea personaria is a species of geometrid moth in the family Geometridae. It was described by Henry Edwards in 1881 and is found in North America.

The MONA or Hodges number for Plataea personaria is 6922.

References

 Scoble, Malcolm J., ed. (1999). Geometrid Moths of the World: A Catalogue (Lepidoptera, Geometridae), 1016.

Further reading

External links

 Butterflies and Moths of North America

Ourapterygini